Deta may refer to:

 Database engine tuning advisor, is a computer software tool for Microsoft SQL Server that enables database tuning
 Dielectric thermal analysis, Dielectric Thermal Analysis or Dielectric Thermal Analyser (an instrument for performing dielectric thermal analysis)
 Diethylenetriamine, is an organic compound with the formula HN(CH2CH2NH2)2
 Deta, Romania, a town in western Romania
 Deta Hedman (born 1959), Jamaican-born, English darts player
 DETA Air, an airline, with bases in Almaty and Shymkent, Kazakhstan.
 DETA Mozambique Airlines